Gjika Amplification was founded in Boston, Massachusetts in the early 1980s, by Robert (Bob) Gjika. Gjika amplifiers are original designs, and are completely hand-wired.

Origins
Robert Gjika was born in Winthrop, Massachusetts, in 1960.  At a young age began building his own guitars and amplifiers. His father was an electrician, giving him an early start in electronics. By 1979, he had established himself in the local Boston area as a luthier, repairing and building guitars and amplifiers for E.U. Wurlitzer Music and Sound. After a year+ working there, he opened up his own shop in Boston, where he was soon in-demand for all things related to guitars and amplifiers. Some of the musicians and bands he did work for included popular Boston bands at the time, guitarists such as Reeves Gabrels, Joe Stump, and other guitarists from the Berklee College of Music scene.

Relocations
Gjika moved his business from Boston to Memphis, Tennessee in 1987, where he met the late Shawn Lane, and introduced Shawn to his guitars and single-ended amp designs. In 1989 he relocated to Los Angeles, California, to focus on producing the "Gold" amps, with a new business partner, Bill Walker, under the brand name "Gjika-Walker". In 1990, after the business partnership was dissolved, Gjika left Los Angeles to go to Austin, Texas, where the music scene was flourishing, and at that time, transitioned from his Gold Amps to his 3-Channel KT90 amplifier.  In 1996 he again relocated, to Nashville, Tennessee.  During these years he continued his amp designing and building, on a smaller scale, until in 2000 he went back to California, where he currently resides and builds his amplifiers in Escondido.

Public reception
In Memphis, Gjika's Quality Guitars, on Union Avenue, was featured in a local music publication, in which Tim O'Shea said of Gjika's skills: "His technical expertise is most impressive, especially his "diagnosis to repair" knowledge of another rock necessity, the electric PA and amp... Gjika also builds and sells his custom, "Hot Box" amplifiers, perhaps the finest available anywhere." Of Bob's custom guitar designs: "Gjika builds three or four of his custom 'Wild Thing' guitars each year, at a cool five grand apiece.  The prototype guitars are truly wonders to behold at any stage of construction."

Focusing on his own playing, as well as designing and building guitars and amps, Gjika acquired a reputation for being reclusive, resulting in many believing that he had retired from amp building. It was noted by Dave Hunter in his reverb.com article, "Dave's Corner: Guide to Boutique Amps", in which he wrote "This enigmatic amp maker and all-round tech extraordinaire goes to few (if any) lengths to promote his own work." As to the quality of the guitar tone produced by Bob's original design amps, he assessed that "Characteristics of Gjika amps include their thick, rich, harmonically saturated tone and fast playing response." Further, "Bob Gjika has worked with Eric Johnson, but might be best known for the scorching single-ended EL34-based amp that the late and largely underappreciated fusion virtuoso Shawn Lane used on his Powers of Ten...a massive beast with four EL34s (or eight in its stereo configuration) and possibly the largest transformers I’ve seen on a guitar amp, giving it earth-shaking body and tremendous gain."

In an interview by Guitar Player magazine, Shawn Lane referred to his use of his Gjika Gold amp on his album Powers of Ten in glowing terms: "It's class-A power, all-tube, and just one of the most amazing amplifiers I've ever heard. It has a harmonic richness that really responds to a certain kind of touch."

Premier Guitar covered the Premier Builder's Guild's NAMM booth featuring Gjika Amps, with highly positive reception.

Worked with
Some of the artists Gjika has worked with:
Shawn Lane,
Tony Rombola,
Eric Johnson,
Joe Stump,
Reeves Gabrels,
Keith Scott,
Webb Wilder,
Steve Earl,
Joe Strummer,
Joe Bonamassa,
George Benson,
Stephen Bruton,
Leo Howard.

References

External links

 Company website

Guitar amplifier manufacturers
Valve amplifiers
Instrument amplifiers
Audio amplifier manufacturers
Music equipment manufacturers
Audio equipment manufacturers of the United States
Manufacturing companies based in Boston
Manufacturing companies based in California
Escondido, California